Synthetic crude is the output from a bitumen/extra heavy oil upgrader facility used in connection with oil sand production. It may also refer to shale oil, an output from an oil shale pyrolysis. The properties of the synthetic crude depend on the processes used in the upgrading. Typically, it is low in sulfur and has an API gravity of around 30. It is also known as "upgraded crude".

Synthetic crude is an intermediate product produced when an extra-heavy or unconventional oil source is upgraded into a transportable form. Synthetic crude is then shipped to oil refineries where it is refined into finished products. Synthetic crude may also be mixed, as a diluent, with heavy oil to create synbit. Synbit is more viscous than synthetic crude, but can also be a less expensive alternative for transporting heavy oil to a conventional refinery≠.

The NewGrade Energy Upgrader became operational in 1988, and was the first upgrader in Canada, now part of the CCRL Refinery Complex.

See also 
 Albian Sands
 Canadian Centre for Energy Information
 History of the petroleum industry in Canada (oil sands and heavy oil)
 Manure-derived synthetic crude oil
 Scotford Upgrader
 Suncor
 Syncrude

References

External links 
 Scotford Upgrader (Shell Canada website) 
 Scotford Complex (Shell Canada website) 
 Muskeg River Mine (Shell Canada website) 
 Scientists find bugs that eat waste and excrete petrol - Times Online

Synthetic fuels
Bituminous sands
Petroleum industry in Canada